Zhi Shuping (born June 1953) is a Chinese politician currently serving as vice chairperson of Proposal Committee of the National Committee of the Chinese people's Political Consultative Conference. Previously he served as director of the General Administration of Quality Supervision, Inspection and Quarantine. He is a member of the 13th Standing Committee of the Chinese People's Political Consultative Conference and a delegate to the 19th National Congress of the Chinese Communist Party. He was an alternate member of the 16th Central Committee of the Chinese Communist Party, a member of the 17th Central Commission for Discipline Inspection, and a member of the 18th Central Committee of the Chinese Communist Party. He was a deputy to the 10th National People's Congress.

Biography
Zhi was born in Huairen County, Shanxi, in June 1953. During the late Cultural Revolution, he taught at Zhuangkuang Middle School, a middle school affiliated to the Datong Mining Bureau, since July 1971. He joined the Chinese Communist Party (CCP) in March 1974. He eventually became secretary of the Youth League Committee of Datong Mining Bureau in September 1982. He served as deputy secretary of Shanxi Provincial Committee of the Communist Youth League in June 1985, and later promoted to the secretary position in November 1990. In July 1994, he became the deputy head of the Organization Department of CCP Shanxi Provincial Committee, rising to the head position the next year. In July 1995, he was admitted to member of the standing committee of the CCP Shanxi Provincial committee, the province's top authority.

In October 1998, he was assigned to the similar position in the neighboring Henan province in 2015. He was deputy party chief of Henan in November 2000, and held that office until October 2005.

He took office as deputy director of the General Administration of Quality Supervision, Inspection and Quarantine in October 2005, and rose to become director in August 2010. In March 2018, he was elected vice chairperson of Proposal Committee of the National Committee of the Chinese people's Political Consultative Conference.

Works

References

1953 births
Living people
People from Shuozhou
Nankai University alumni
Renmin University of China alumni
People's Republic of China politicians from Shanxi
Chinese Communist Party politicians from Shanxi
Members of the 18th Central Committee of the Chinese Communist Party
Alternate members of the 16th Central Committee of the Chinese Communist Party
Delegates to the 10th National People's Congress